Bernard Toohey (born 18 February 1963) is a former Australian rules footballer who played during the 1980s and early 1990s as a defender.

Toohey started his career in 1981 with Geelong, where he played for five years. He then moved up to Sydney and earned All-Australian selection in 1987. Two years later, he spent half of the season at full-forward and was the Swans' leading goal-kicker.

External links

1963 births
Living people
Geelong Football Club players
Sydney Swans players
Western Bulldogs players
Victorian State of Origin players
New South Wales Australian rules football State of Origin players
All-Australians (1953–1988)
Australian rules footballers from New South Wales